Loku Yaddehige Sujeewa Priyalal (born 9 May 1973 in Colombo, Sri Lanka) popularly known as Sujeewa Priyalal is a Sri Lankan actor, producer, writer and film director. He appeared first lead character as "Piyal" in Machan Sinhala film in 2008.

Personal life 
Sujeewa Priyalal was born on 9 May 1973 in Colombo, Sri Lanka. His father was Mendis Priyalal and mother, D. Edirisooriya. Sujeewa has two brothers and two sisters in his family. He attended Isipathana College, Colombo, Sri Lanka.

In 2015 he married with Sri Lankan professional actress Duleeka Marapana.

Career 
Sujeewa is one of the actors in Sri Lankan cinema, film writer, producer and a Director. He appeared first lead role in Machan Sinhala film in 2008. As well as he has contributed in acting for Sri Lankan films The Frozen Fire, Maya 3D, Prathiroo, Ira Handa Yata, Suparna. He appeared in television as the role of "Themiya" in Divithura teledrama on Hiru TV. He contributed a role in popular Sri Lankan teledrama Snap broadcast on Swarnawahini.

In 2020 He produced and directed Suparna Sri Lankan Sinhala film.

Filmography

Television

Films

References

External links 

 
 කොරෝනා කියන්නේ Political Game එකක්... | Sujeewa Priyal
 Patta Pata Pata with Duleeka Marapana - 10th February 2015
 මුල්ම සම්මානය ගන්න නැගිටිද්දි අම්මා මගෙ මූණටම ගැහුවා..!
 සුජීව ප්‍රියාල් දකින දුලීකා මාරපන ගේ ආදරය
 සැබෑ ජීවිතයේ සුජීව වේදිකාවේ ලෝරන්ස්
 දුලීකාගේ විවාහය ගැන කටකතා
 මාරපන එදිරිව අභයකෝන් නඩුවහි කතාව

Living people
1973 births
Sinhalese actors
Sri Lankan male film actors